Conscious is the eighth studio album from Australian singer-songwriter Guy Sebastian. It was released on 3 November 2017.

Reception

Hayden Benfield from Renowned for Sound praised "the funky guitars and R&B beats" of "High on Me" before saying "With Conscious, Sebastian has sought to move away from his tendency to do take after take in search of the perfect vocal delivery, instead seeking to make it feel “a bit more real”" adding "For an artist who has grown so steadily through his career, Conscious neither represents stagnation or a backward step for Sebastian, but nor does it represent progress. David from auspOp was complimentary saying it's "one of his best efforts in a long time, the album is a showcase of quality Australian music" praising "Set in Stone", "Vesuvius", "Chasing Lights" and "Sober" adding "Where Guy continues to shine though is on the big mid-tempo numbers." Leigh Sanders from Star and Express said "[Sebastian's] vocals ... are switching constantly. From deep and booming verses to some pretty high-octave choruses Guy shows that he's not afraid to attack a song from different angles." adding "It's solid if not spectacular."

Singles
"High On Me" was released as the album's lead single on 1 September 2017 and peaked at number 73 on the ARIA Singles Chart.

"Bloodstone" was released as the album's second single on 20 October 2017. It peaked at number 59 on the ARIA Singles Chart, gaining platinum certification in 2019.

Promotional singles
"Keep Me Coming Back" was released as the first promotional single on 29 September 2017, followed by "Vesuvius" on 6 October 2017, and "Exclusive" on 13 October 2017.  "Stay in Bed" was released on 27 October 2017 as the fourth and final promotional single.

Track listing
Notes
 "Reprise" is a piano/acoustic version of Sober.

Conscious Tour
On 6 September, Sebastian announced the Conscious Tour, saying: "The Conscious album has been a labour of love and to be able to translate it on a live stage is really exciting! The sound of this album has also inspired me to explore different interpretations of previous songs, giving them a new life for 2017."

Charts

Weekly charts

Year-end charts

Release history

References

2017 albums
Guy Sebastian albums
Sony Music Australia albums